The BioInitiative Report is a report on the relationship between the electromagnetic fields (EMF) associated with powerlines and wireless devices and health. It was self-published online, without peer review, on 31 August 2007, by a group "of 14 scientists, researchers, and public health policy professionals". The BioInitiative Report states that it is an examination of the controversial health risks of electromagnetic fields and radiofrequency radiation. Some updated BioInitiative material was published in a journal in an issue guest-edited by one of the members of the group, and a 2012 version of the report was released on 7 January 2013. It has been heavily criticized by independent and governmental research groups for its lack of balance.

History
In 2006, at the Bioelectromagnetics Society's annual meeting, there was a mini-symposium on electromagnetic fields and radiofrequency radiation to present the science showing biological effects, and the precautionary measures taken by countries around the world.  The Bioinitiative Working Group grew out of this conference and decided to write a report on the science and health risks to alert people who could translate the science into public policy.  From October 2006 to August 2007, 14 scientists and public health experts, headed by Cindy Sage and David O. Carpenter, worked to come up with recommendations for the Bioinitiative Report.

Since 2007, some of the material was revised, updated and submitted for peer-reviewed publication and published in the August 2009 issue of Pathophysiology, an issue guest-edited by Martin Blank, one of the three members of the BioInitiative Organizing Committee.

An updated 2012 version of the report was released on 7 January 2013.

Criticism
The following government health authorities and independent expert groups have reviewed the BioInitiative Report and made the following comments on the merit of its claims.

Health Council of the Netherlands

The Health Council of the Netherlands reviewed the BioInitiative report in September 2008 and concluded it is a selective review of existing research and does not present a balanced analysis considering the relative scientific quality of different studies. Some of the shortcomings identified included that the report made false claims as well as claims which lacked scientific basis.

In 2008, they concluded:

Australian Centre for Radiofrequency Bioeffects Research (ACRBR)

In December 2008 the Australian Centre for Radiofrequency Bioeffects Research (ACRBR) reviewed the BioInitiative Report and concluded:

The ACRBR also points out there are statements in the report that do not accord with the standard view of science, and the report does not provide a reasonable account of why we should reject the standard view in favour of the views espoused in the report.

The ACRBR also noted that the state of science in this area is continually being debated and updated by a number of expert bodies composed of the leading experts in this field and strongly urged people to consult these views for a balanced assessment of the research.

European Commission’s EMF-NET

The European Commission's EMF-NET coordination group for investigating the impact of electromagnetic fields on health made the following comments in October 2007 regarding the BioInitiative Report:

Institute of Electrical and Electronics Engineers (IEEE) Committee on Man and Radiation (COMAR)

The Institute of Electrical and Electronics Engineers (IEEE) Committee on Man and Radiation (COMAR) reviewed the BioInitiative Report in 2009. They concluded:

German Federal Office for Radiation Protection

The German Federal Office for Radiation Protection (BfS) commented in October 2007 on a newsmagazine TV show on the German network ARD that featured the BioInitiative Report shortly after its release. They said:

French Agency for Environmental and Occupational Health Safety
The French Agency for Environmental and Occupational Health Safety (Agence française de sécurité sanitaire de l’environnement et du travail, AFSSET) analysed the contents of the BioInitiative Report and in October 2009 said:

Indian Council of Medical Research
The Indian Council of Medical Research reviewed the 2012 version of Bioinitiative Report in February 2013 and said:

Other
In the March/April 2008 newsletter of the Bioelectromagnetics Society, publishers of the journal Bioelectromagnetics and to which several BioInitiative Report contributors belong, a commentary noted "...analysis by good theoretical physicists suggests that nothing is going to happen but the deposition of additional energy that, if sufficient, can elevate tissue temperature. But physicists don’t know everything so we turn to the biologists and find that an analysis of the biological database reveals no consistently reproducible (independent) LLNT effect after about 50 or 60 years of research."

See also
 COSMOS cohort study
 Electromagnetic hypersensitivity
 Electromagnetic radiation and health
 Wireless device radiation and health

References

External links
 BioInitiative Report
 World Health Organization EMF Project
 International Commission on Non Ionizing Radiation
 European Environment Agency

Works about health
Wireless
Environmental health
Politics of the European Union